Namak-ri is a small town in Samhyang-myeon, which is part of Muan County in South Jeolla province of South Korea. Namak-ri became the home of the South Jeolla provincial government following its move from the city of Gwangju in 2005.

Overview
The relocation of the provincial office to Namak is causing many changes in the area. Previously it was just a small farming area with most inhabitants working in that industry. A new city is being constructed around the provincial office with its neighbour Mokpo.

Construction plan

The central government officially declared the plan to build a new city on May 13, 1993.

Eight years later, it was announced the residential area would occupy . Jeonnam province applied for approval in February 2002. Four months later the official plan was changed and it received approval.

Eco city
Muan country is strongly trying to develop the Namak area as an "eco-city". This includes elevating the importance of establishing parks and forests.

Promotion to city
The plan for promoting county to city is on the way by civil workers of Muan. The South Korean government has set its standards for making the new site.

Muan was nominated as an enterprise city and also Muan International Airport was opened. One officer said that new downtown area is going to get its own power by governmental development propulsion.

References

External links 
  official page of Namak city

Villages in South Korea
Muan County